The consensus 1954 College Basketball All-American team, as determined by aggregating the results of six major All-American teams.  To earn "consensus" status, a player must win honors from a majority of the following teams: the Associated Press, Look Magazine, The United Press International, the Newspaper Enterprise Association (NEA), Collier's Magazine and the International News Service.

1954 Consensus All-America team

Individual All-America teams

AP Honorable Mention:

 Jesse Arnelle, Penn State
 B. H. Born, Kansas
 Don Bragg, UCLA
 John Clune, Navy
 Ed Conlin, Fordham
 Larry Costello, Niagara
 Rudy D'Emilio, Duke
 Paul Ebert, Ohio State
 Dick Garmaker, Minnesota
 Sihugo Green, Duquesne
 Swede Halbrook, Oregon State
 Joe Holup, George Washington
 Ed Kalafat, Minnesota
 Don Lange, Navy
 Cleo Littleton, Wichita State
 Bob Matheny, California
 Bob McKeen, California
 Joe Pehanick, Seattle
 Dick Rosenthal, Notre Dame
 Bob Schafer, Villanova
 Gene Schwinger, Rice
 Ken Sears, Santa Clara
 Gene Shue, Maryland
 Mel Thompson, North Carolina State
 Lou Tsioropoulos, Kentucky
 Jim Tucker, Duquesne
 Buzzy Wilkinson, Virginia

See also
 1953–54 NCAA men's basketball season

References

NCAA Men's Basketball All-Americans
All-Americans